Caroline Wozniacki was the defending champion, but chose to compete in Monterrey instead.

Elina Svitolina won the title, defeating Eugenie Bouchard in the final, 6–7(5–7), 6–4, 7–5.

Seeds

Draw

Finals

Top half

Bottom half

Qualifying

Seeds

Qualifiers

Draw

First qualifier

Second qualifier

Third qualifier

Fourth qualifier

Fifth qualifier

Sixth qualifier

References
Main Draw
Qualifying Draw

Malaysian Open
Malaysian Open (tennis)